Nelson is a census-designated place (CDP) in Pima County, Arizona, United States. The population was 259 at the 2010 census.

History
As early as 1934, Nelson appeared as a named location, remaining undeveloped until 1973. At the 2010 census, the area was designated as a CDP in Pima County, listed as part of the Marana CCD.

Geography
Nelson is located at  (32.42981, −111.264924).

Demographics

As of the 2010 census, there were 259 people living in the CDP: 123 male and 136 female. 73 were 19 years old or younger, 55 were ages 20–34, 49 were between the ages of 35 and 49, 55 were between 50 and 64, and the remaining 26 were aged 65 and above. The median age was 36.2 years.

The racial makeup of the CDP was 81.9% White, 1.5% American Indian, 1.5% Black or African American, 1.2% Asian, 13.5% Other, and 0.4% two or more races.  27% of the population were Hispanic or Latino of any race.

There were 89 households in the CDP, 66 family households (74.2%) and 23 non-family households (25.8%), with an average household size of 2.91. Of the family households, 44 were married couples living together, while there were 6 single fathers and 16 single mothers; the non-family households included 16 adults living alone: eight male and eight female.

The CDP contained 100 housing units, of which 89 were occupied and 11 were vacant.

References

Census-designated places in Pima County, Arizona